Kadzinuni is a settlement in Kenya's Coast Province.

The Friends of Kadzinuni

Is a UK based charity which is working to transform Kadzinuni into self-sufficient wealth creating community through support of community led projects for Healthcare, Education and Agriculture. You find much more information about Kadzinuni, its people and the projects supported at www.kadzinuni.org.uk

The Friends of Kadzinuni is UK Registered Charity No. 1098881. Based in Keyworth, Nottinghamshire, UK. Hon Patron Joanna Lumley OBE. Between 2003 and 2013 over £200,000 has been provided to facilitate the transformation.

References 

Populated places in Coast Province